The Halo Graphic Novel is a graphic novel anthology of the military science fiction video game series Halo, published by Marvel Comics in partnership with Bungie. The Halo Graphic Novel was the series' first entry into the sequential art medium, and features aspects of the Halo universe which until then had not been discussed or seen in any medium.

The majority of the book is divided into four short stories by different writers and artists from the computer game and comic industries. Each story focuses on different aspects of the Halo universe, revealing stories that are tangential to the main plot of the game. Apart from the stories, the book also contains an extensive art gallery compiled of contributions from Bungie, Marvel and independent sources.

Released on July 19, 2006, The Halo Graphic Novel was well-received, with reviewers noting the cohesiveness of the work as a whole, as well as the diversity of the individual material. The success of the novel led to Marvel announcing a new limited comic series, Halo: Uprising, and other future Halo comic books.

Background and publication 
The origins for the Halo Graphic Novel lay in Microsoft and Bungie's exploration of new mediums to expand the Halo franchise into, with sequential art being the main focus. The comic was originally pitched by the head of Microsoft's Franchise Development Eric Trautmann, who led the assembly of a draft comic written by John Ney Rieber and illustrated by Adi Granov. Bungie disliked the comic and Trautmann's comic team, with art director Lorraine McLees calling it "a lump of coal". Bungie asked to choose their own artists and writers instead. Pete Parsons, the studio director of Bungie, wanted to hire Alan Moore and Joe Kubert for the graphic novel, though Trautmann was highly skeptical that such high-profile artists would deign to work on the project.

After many unsuccessful negotiation attempts, Lorraine suggested that Bungie finance and edit the novel itself before pursuing a publisher, allowing the studio to maintain control over the content and pursue the venture unencumbered by outside intervention. Lead designer Maria Cabardo created a "dream team" roster of writers and artists Bungie admired, and through a period of negotiation Bungie was able to gain contributions from many of those named on the list. Buoyed by their success in approaching those in the medium that they respected and admired, including British comic book artist Simon Bisley and French artist Jean "Moebius" Giraud, the progress of Halo Graphic Novel was described as a "cool morale boost for our team to see their universe, their characters, realized by people that we idolize in the comic industry."

The novel was completed after a two-year development cycle and Bungie sought out a publisher, eventually approaching Marvel Comics. Bungie cited Marvel's "passion for Halo" and "reach in the comic and publishing industry" as the main draws to the company. The studio worked alongside Marvel director of development Ruwan Jayatilleke, an early champion of the project, to assist in the distribution and publication of the novel.

The stories themselves were designed as glimpses into the Halo universe, including information on the inner workings of the alien Covenant, as well as details regarding elements of the backstory that were hitherto undisclosed. Jarrard explained that "The stories that happen off camera, the parallel events to the arcs that our fans know from the existing mediums, are the stories we really wanted to tell." Jarrard further described this as an attempt to move away from the story of the Master Chief, the central character of the franchise, and focus instead on what they believed to be the core themes that lay behind the game universe, such as maintaining hope in the face of overwhelming odds and humanity's struggle for survival; themes that extended beyond "...a genetically enhanced super soldier picking up two guns and kicking some alien butt." The four stories that ended up in the final publication were "the most interesting to [Bungie], and the writers of [the novel]". Although Bungie created the story arcs present in the Halo Graphic Novel, the studio described the importance of providing a framework for each story that the various artists and writers could tell without jeopardizing their own voice. Artist Simon Bisley said that, "The stress was to make the characters look very much as they do in the game. Beyond that point I was given free rein to interpret the script and the action" based on what was given to the artists and writers.

Contents

The graphic novel comprises 128 pages and four main stories; each has an introduction by the creators of the work detailing their thoughts about the plot or their experiences adding to the Halo lore.

The Last Voyage of the Infinite Succor 
"The Last Voyage of the Infinite Succor" takes place during the video game Halo: Combat Evolved. The Covenant Special Operations Commander Rtas 'Vadumee and his team are sent to answer the distress call from a Covenant agricultural ship, Infinite Succor. Believing that it might have been attacked by humans, 'Vadumee and his team instead discover the ship has been infested by the parasitic Flood, who gain the knowledge of those they infect and are trying to use the ship to escape imprisonment. Fighting waves of Flood, including the reanimated remains of his fallen soldiers, and being wounded and losing the left mandibles on his jaw, 'Vadumee plots a slipspace course into the system's sun that destroys Infinite Succor and the Flood, then escapes via a Covenant shuttle as the sole survivor.

The central premise behind the story of "The Last Voyage of the Infinite Succor" was to showcase the true danger posed by the Flood and the inner workings of the Covenant military machine, to dispel the image of the Covenant as enemies that merely sit around for players to shoot. The story was written by Lee Hammock with art provided by Simon Bisley. Hammock described the process of writing the story as a "heady task" since he had to respect Halo fans' knowledge of the characters and canon, ensuring that "characters that [the fans] know as a part of themselves are portrayed aptly". These difficulties were mitigated by the knowledge that fans were not as intimately connected to the history of the character of Rtas as they were to the likes of the Master Chief; this allowed ample room to expand 'Vadumee's background in sync with the Halo canon while permitting the writer to "bring something new to the table".

Armor Testing 
In the Halo universe, Earth and humanity's various colonies are governed by the United Nations Space Command. Faced with the technological superiority of the Covenant, humanity's chief hope is the tenacity of the SPARTANs, elite supersoldiers equipped with special armor. The protagonist of the Halo series, the Master Chief, is one of the few SPARTANs in active service by the events of Halo: Combat Evolved. "Armor Testing" takes place shortly before the opening of Halo 2, as the UNSC field-tests a new version of the SPARTAN's armor in a series of exercises which prove to be a challenging endeavor for all involved. A lone SPARTAN puts the armor through its paces by dropping from Earth's atmosphere and engaging in a mock battle against UNSC special forces. This SPARTAN is revealed to be a woman, Maria-062, who has come out of retirement as a special favor to test the new equipment before it is sent to the Master Chief.

The concept of the story was inspired by the book Skunkworks, a memoir of the testing of military projects at Lockheed; highlighting the rigorous experimentation the SPARTAN equipment goes through before it ends up in the hands of the Master Chief was an idea that Bungie originally wanted to pursue at the beginning of Halo 2. Bungie instead opted to communicate this background information at a later time. "Armor Testing" was written by Jay Faerber with pencils by W. Andrew Robinson and colors by Ed Lee.

Breaking Quarantine 
Like "The Last Voyage of the Infinite Succor", "Breaking Quarantine" deals with the Flood outbreak that occurs during Halo. While "The Last Voyage" tells the story from the Covenant perspective, "Breaking Quarantine" highlights the escape of the human soldier Sgt. Johnson from the Flood. Johnson is a minor personality in Halo: Combat Evolved who becomes an important character in the following two games; while the novel Halo: First Strike explains that Johnson resists Flood infestation due to a medical condition, no other story up to that point explained how Johnson escapes. "Breaking Quarantine" is an example of Bungie's attempts to expand the story arcs of secondary characters that would have no opportunity to go explained in the main storyline. Unlike the other stories, "Breaking Quarantine" contains no dialogue, only weapon sound effects, which are rendered in Japanese. Both art and story were provided by Tsutomu Nihei, a manga artist and architect who based his illustrations directly on the structures found within the game.

Second Sunrise over New Mombasa 
Near the beginning of Halo 2, the Covenant stumble upon humanity's best-guarded secret—the location of Earth—and launch a direct attack on the city of New Mombasa, Kenya. By the time players arrive at the city in Halo 2, it is deserted; "Second Sunrise", which takes place during the attack, explains that this was not always the case. The story is told through the eyes of a reporter who creates propaganda for the UNSC. When the Covenant invade the city, the reporter and fellow citizens take to its defense, until they are forced to flee as the city faces ruin.

Bungie described "Second Sunrise" as an attempt to put a human face on the conflict by illustrating the effects of war on the common citizen. The story was written by Brett Lewis with art provided by Jean "Moebius" Giraud. Giraud explained that his son's enjoyment of the game series ultimately compelled him to accept an invitation to contribute his art; before penciling, he had never played the video games.

Supplemental 
Located after the main body of stories is a selection of art pieces that represent interpretations of the Halo universe from a number of comic book artists. These contributors include Doug Alexander, Rick Berry, Geof Darrow, and more than twenty-five others, both freelance and from Bungie—including lead composer Martin O'Donnell.

A few promotional pieces were created before the Halo Graphic Novel'''s release date, including a sixteen-page preview, released May 31, 2006, which contained Bungie's introductions to each story along with short excerpts of each story. A full-color poster of the book's cover was released on June 28, 2006.

 Reception 
Critical reaction from both the gaming community and the comic book community was positive. UGO Networks praised the novel, citing the wealth of contributions from recognized artists and the strength of the material in fleshing out the Halo universe as the work's greatest strength. They gave it an overall grade of B+. Mike Deeley of Comics Bulletin lauded the book for the diverse range of storytelling and art styles that lent the Halo Graphic Novel the feel of an anthology yet still retained a cohesive whole. Other areas that received particular attention included Tsutomu Nihei's work on Breaking Quarantine for its vivid imagery and its focus on visual storytelling in lieu of any dialogue.

Some reviewers expressed their disappointment at the novel's focus on minor characters and events, with the presence of the Master Chief—the central character of the Halo series and its most iconic figure—limited to featuring in artwork and a brief appearance in the first story. On the other hand, GameTrailers praised Bungie for having the moxie to not focus on the major character. Each publication had their own opinions on the weakest story in the collection; both IGN and GameTrailers thought that "Armor Testing" had the least emotional impact, although its surprise ending and art were well done.

Upon release, the Halo Graphic Novel proved to be a "rare hit" for the games-to-comics genre, debuting at No.2 on both the Nielsen BookScan and Diamond sales charts. At least 100,000 copies were rumored to have been published, and the comic continued to be one of the top-selling graphic novels months after its debut. The success of the novel led Marvel Comics and Bungie to announce a four-issue monthly Halo comic series at San Diego Comic-Con 2006 called Halo: Uprising''. Despite delays, the first issue of the limited series was released on August 22, 2007.

Dark Horse released a new edition of the graphic novel in 2021.

References

External links 
 Bungie
 Marvel Comics 

2006 comics debuts
Graphic Novel
Marvel Comics graphic novels
Comics based on Halo (franchise)
English-language books
Comics by Jean Giraud
Comics set on fictional planets
Science fiction graphic novels